Marlon Singh (born 11 June 1963) is a sailor from United States Virgin Islands, who represented his country at the 1984 Summer Olympics in Los Angeles, United States as crew member in the Soling. With helmsman Jean Braure and fellow crew member Kirk Grybowski they took the 22nd place.

References

External links
 
 
 

1963 births
Living people
United States Virgin Islands male sailors (sport)
Olympic sailors of the United States Virgin Islands
Sailors at the 1984 Summer Olympics – Soling